New Hampshire is a state in the United States of America.

New Hampshire may also refer to:
Province of New Hampshire, the colonial-era predecessor of the U.S. state
New Hampshire, Ohio, an unincorporated community in Auglaize County
New Hampshire (collection), a collection of poetry by Robert Frost
New Hampshire (chicken), a breed of chicken
USS New Hampshire (1864), a storeship
USS New Hampshire (BB-25), a Connecticut-class battleship commissioned in 1908
USS New Hampshire (BB-70), a Montana-class battleship authorized in 1940 but canceled in 1943
USS New Hampshire (SSN-778), a Virginia-class submarine commissioned in 2008
University of New Hampshire
New Hampshire Wildcats, the athletic teams of the University of New Hampshire
New Hampshire Avenue, a street in Washington, DC

See also